NOI or Noi may refer to:

Acronyms
 Nation of Islam, an African American political and religious movement
 Nation People Together (Națiune Oameni Împreună), a Romanian political party
 National Olympiad in Informatics, for selection to the International Olympiad in Informatics
 New Historical Option, a Moldovan political party
 Net operating income
 Ngozi Okonjo-Iweala (born 1954), Nigerian politician
 NOI Techpark, Bolzano, Italy
 Nupe–Oko–Idoma languages, a subgroup of Volta–Niger languages

Arts and entertainment
 Noi (album), by Eros Ramazzotti, 2012
 Noi the Albino, a 2003 Icelandic film directed by Dagur Kári
 Noi, a 2022 Italian adaptation of the American TV series This Is Us

People with the surname
 Eric Noi (born 1967), English boxer
 Kouat Noi (born 1997), Sudanese-born Australian basketball player
 Reece Noi (born 1988), British Ghanaian actor
 Trinidad de la Noi (born 1998), Chilean model and actress

Other uses
 Noi River, Thailand
 Bhilori language (ISO language code)

See also